Khalil Kallas (born 1 July 1942) is a Lebanese fencer. He competed in the individual épée event at the 1968 Summer Olympics.

References

External links
 

1942 births
Living people
Lebanese male épée fencers
Olympic fencers of Lebanon
Fencers at the 1968 Summer Olympics